The Sri Lankan national cricket team toured New Zealand February to April 1995 and played a two-match Test series against the New Zealand national cricket team. Sri Lanka won the series 1–0. New Zealand were captained by Ken Rutherford and Sri Lanka by Arjuna Ranatunga. In addition, the teams went on to play a three-match series of Limited Overs Internationals (LOI) which New Zealand won 2–1. This was the first time that Sri Lanka won a test as well as a test series in New Zealand.

Test series summary
 1st Test at McLean Park, Napier – Sri Lanka won by 241 runs
 2nd Test at Carisbrook, Dunedin – match drawn

First Test

Second Test

One Day Internationals (ODIs)

New Zealand won the series 2-1.

1st ODI

2nd ODI

3rd ODI

References

External links

1995 in Sri Lankan cricket
1995 in New Zealand cricket
International cricket competitions from 1994–95 to 1997
New Zealand cricket seasons from 1970–71 to 1999–2000
1995